Gotongouiné 1 is a village in western Ivory Coast. It is in the sub-prefecture of Sangouiné, Man Department, Tonkpi Region, Montagnes District. Two-and-a-half kilometres southeast of the village is the smaller village Gotongouiné 2.

Gotongouiné 1 was a commune until March 2012, when it became one of 1126 communes nationwide that were abolished.

Notes

Former communes of Ivory Coast
Populated places in Montagnes District
Populated places in Tonkpi